Globerman is a surname. Notable people with the surname include:

Yael Globerman (born 1954), Israeli poet, writer, translator, and educator
 (1905–1947), IDF General

See also
Glaberman
Glauberman